LS6 or LS-6 may refer to:

 Rolladen-Schneider LS6, glider (1983–2003) 
 GM 2500 engine LS6, straight-4 engine (1978–1979)
 GM LS engine LS6, V8 engine (2000s)
Chevrolet Big-Block engine LS-6 (454in³), V8 engine (1970s)
 LS PGB, a Chinese satellite-guided munition similar to American JDAM, only with more range, as it is a glide bomb.
 The Headingley and Hyde Park postcode area of Leeds
 LS6 (novel), by Mario Crespo